Gobeyr-e Seh (also known as Gobairé Sehe Shaikh Shaye, Gobeyr, and Gobeyr-e Seh-e Sheykh Shāyeh) is a village in Anaqcheh Rural District, in the Central District of Ahvaz County, Khuzestan Province, Iran. At the 2006 census, its population was 1,024, in 215 families.

References 

Populated places in Ahvaz County